Euphoriomyces is a genus of fungi in the family Laboulbeniaceae. The genus contain 13 species.

References

External links
Euphoriomyces at Index Fungorum

Laboulbeniomycetes